"I Am" is a song by Australian pop-rock group Uncanny X-Men. The song was released in April 1986 as the lead single from the band's second studio album, What You Give Is What You Get. The song as the first single released by the band on CBS Records. It peaked at number 18 on the Kent Music Report.

Track listing 
7" Vinyl (CBS - BA 3445)
 "I Am" 
 "Treat Me Nice" 
 "Kill the Children"

12" Vinyl (CBS - BA12206)
 "I Am" (Extended Version)	
 "Seaside"	
 "Treat Me Nice" 
 "Kill the Children"

Charts

References

1986 singles
Uncanny X-Men (band) songs
CBS Records singles